Richmond Theological College (also called "Richmond College") was a Methodist (Wesleyan) college in Richmond, London. 
It was a college for training ministers and missionaries between 1843 and 1972.

In 1902 the College became a part of the University of London.

When the College was closed, in 1972, the campus was transferred into The American International University in London.

Footnotes

External links 
 Wesleyan Theological Institution: Southern Branch, Richmond (1843-1972) on "Dissenting Academies Online" with a.o. an extensive list of tutors and students

Defunct universities and colleges in London
Methodist universities and colleges
Former theological colleges in England
Richmond, London